Kevin Parent (born 12 December 1972) is a Canadian singer-songwriter from Quebec. He is fluent in both English and French.

Early life 
Although his first language is English, he was born in Greenfield Park, Quebec (now a borough of the city of Longueuil), and was raised and educated in the French-speaking area of Bay of Chaleur (Gaspé Peninsula) in the municipality of Nouvelle during his childhood and attended high school at the École Antoine-Bernard in Carleton-sur-Mer.

Career 

In 1993, Parent participated in a songwriting competition, and was consequently signed to Tacca Musique shortly thereafter. His first album, "Pigeon d'argile" sold over 360,000 copies, making it one of the greatest Québécois album sales successes of the decade.

Hit singles "Nomade sedentaire", "Seigneur" and "Boomerang", made Parent became well known in Quebec music in the 1990s, winning a number of Felix Awards in the province and touring on both sides of the Atlantic. Two years later, Kevin released "Grand Parleur, Petit Faiseur", which also sold more than 350,000 copies and earned Kevin the Felix Award for Rock Album of the Year in 1998. His follow-up albums, Les Vents ont changé (2001) and Retrouvailles (2003), which featured collaborations with Claire Pelletier, Catherine Durand, among others, both achieved multi-platinum status and earned him Juno Award nominations (including a win for the best selling Francophone album of 2002) and Felix Awards.

Parent has also worked as an actor, with acting roles including Jean-Marc Vallée's 2011 film Café de Flore and Sonia Boileau's 2019 film Rustic Oracle.

He now lives in the town of Miguasha. Miguasha is also the title of one album he published in 2009.

Discography 

 1995: Pigeon d'argile
 1998: Grand parleur, petit faiseur
 2001: Les Vents ont changé
 2003: Retrouvailles
 2007: Fangless Wolf Facing Winter – English album
 2009: Miguasha
 2016: Kanji – English album

Compilation 
 2006: Kevin Parent Compilation

References 

 Kevin Parent discography: https://www.discogs.com/fr/artist/1132259-Kevin-Parent

External links 

 Quebec Info Musique: Kevin Parent
 TQS: Kevin Parent profile
The Canadian Encyclopedia: Kevin Parent

1972 births
Living people
Canadian rock singers
Canadian singer-songwriters
Canadian male film actors
French Quebecers
Juno Award for Francophone Album of the Year winners
People from Gaspésie–Îles-de-la-Madeleine
People from Longueuil
Singers from Quebec
Anglophone Quebec people
Audiogram (label) artists
French-language singers of Canada
21st-century Canadian male singers
Canadian male singer-songwriters